Aetokremmos is a Locality in Kili Village, Cyprus and is situated 538 metres above sea level. Its peak is around 626 metres. Melissovounos is located 1.2 km away and Asprovounos 2.5 km away.

References 

Paphos District
Populated places in Cyprus